One of the Baes is a 2019 Philippine television drama romance comedy series broadcast by GMA Network. It premiered on the network's Telebabad line up and worldwide via GMA Pinoy TV from September 30, 2019 to January 31, 2020, replacing The Better Woman.

Series overview

Episodes

References

Lists of Philippine drama television series episodes